Chaoyang Township is an rural township in Cili County, Zhangjiajie, Hunan Province, People's Republic of China.

Administrative division
The township is divided into 12 villages, the following areas: Yanping Village, Sanrong Village, Hongyuan Village, Chaoyang Village, Siping Village, Shuangya Village, Luogu Village, Miaogang Village, Wanfu Village, Shabaijie Village, Heyan Village, and Jinlong Village (岩坪村、三溶村、洪源村、朝阳村、四坪村、双垭村、锣鼓村、庙岗村、万福村、沙泊街村、合堰村、金龙村).

References

Former towns and townships of Cili County